Omatako may refer to the following places and jurisdictions in central Namibia:

 Omatako Constituency
 Omatako Mountains
 Omatako Dam